Laps in Seven is the title of a 2006 album by the progressive bluegrass artist Sam Bush, on the Sugar Hill  label.

Reception 

In his Allmusic review, music critic Ronnie D. Lankford, Jr. called the album "an eclectic stew, and he has no problem shifting from acoustic to electric, from vocals to instrumentals. Even with this open approach, Bush's music often expresses a "settled" quality that feels rather safe and lacking in soul... Despite these criticisms, Bush can't be accused of sleeping on the job. He always turns out a professional product that pleases fans, and in this fashion, Laps in Seven is no different."

Track listing
 "The River's Gonna Run" (Julie Miller) - 4:01
 "Bringing In The Georgia Mail" (Fred Rose) - 3:57
 "The Dolphin Dance" (Sam Bush) - 3:14
 "On The Road" (John Hartford) - 5:00
 "Ridin' That Bluegrass Train" (John Pennell, Sam Bush) - 3:46
 "I Wanna Do Right" (Jeff Black, Sam Bush) - 4:34
 "Where There's A Road" (Robbie Fulks) - 3:53
 "New Country" (Jean-Luc Ponty) - 4:09
 "Ballad For A Soldier" (Leon Russell) - 4:35
 "River Take Me" (Darrell Scott) - 7:11
 "White Bird" (David LaFlamme, Linda LaFlamme) - 6:00
 "Laps In Seven" (Scott Vestal, Sam Bush, Byron House) - 5:00

Personnel
Sam Bush - mandolin, fiddle, guitar, vocals
Keith Sewell - guitar
Scott Vestal - banjo, banjo synthesizer
Byron House - bass, vocals
Chris Brown - drums
Additional personnel:
Jean-Luc Ponty - electric violin
Emmylou Harris - vocals
Shaun Murphy - vocals
Tim O'Brien - vocals
Andrea Zonn - vocals

References

Sam Bush albums
2006 albums
Sugar Hill Records albums